Colonnades Shopping Centre is a shopping centre in Adelaide, South Australia. The shopping centre is located in the City of Onkaparinga, in the suburb of Noarlunga Centre. Colonnades is located on a large allotment of land with access from Goldsmith Drive, Beach Road and Burgess Road. Colonnades is currently the 3rd largest shopping centre in metropolitan Adelaide behind both Westfield Marion and Westfield Tea Tree Plaza. 

Since opening the centre has seen multiple expansions including the most recent being a $51m expansion adding an Aldi and more market feel area.

Transport
Colonnades Shopping Centre is serviced by both Noarlunga Centre railway station and Colonnades Interchange, and is the hub for public transport in the outer Southern Suburbs of Adelaide.

The shopping centre is also serviced by a taxi rank just outside of the centre itself.

History
Colonnades Shopping Centre was built in 1979 and had a wing added to the northern end of the centre in the mid-late 2000s which included a Woolworths supermarket. Colonnades Shopping Centre was acquired by Centro in 2003, and underwent a A$125 million expansion, which has seen the building of a larger Woolworths, and the addition of a Big W among many other shops. The new wing also added a number of speciality shops to the expanded area.

The centre contains three supermarkets, two department stores and approximately 200 other specialty stores. The mall also contains a food court.

In 2019, Myer permanently closed its doors after 40 years of operation.

The shopping centre has laid and connected 5000 solar panels on its rooftop. The 1.8 megawatts (MW) system is generating renewable power to reduce dependence on the national grid and contribute towards the environment of the local community.

Gallery

See also

Noarlunga Cinema Centre

References 

Shopping centres in Adelaide
Shopping malls established in 1979
Tourist attractions in Adelaide